Three vessels of the Royal Navy have been named HMS Poole after Poole:
  was a 32-gun Lyme group frigate launched in 1696, converted into a fireship in 1719 and sunk as a foundation at Harwich in 1737.
  was a 44-gun 1741 Establishment frigate launched in 1745 and broken up in 1765.
  was a Bangor-class minesweeper launched in 1941 and sold for breaking up in 1948.

References
 

Royal Navy ship names